The Friendship Trophy is a football match, contested on an irregular basis by just two teams: Norwich City and Sunderland. The match dates back to the camaraderie forged between fans of the two clubs at the time of the 1985 Football League Cup Final that they contested. Norwich City won the 1985 Football League Cup Final, however at the end of the First Division Season, both teams were relegated to the Second Division.

Mackem and Canary mingled and drank happily together. “The Sunderland supporters were magnificent and everyone seemed to mix, it was light-hearted and very nice,” judged Norwich manager Ken Brown after his team had lifted the trophy thanks to a Gordon Chisholm own goal. On the London Underground, Norwich fans sang “we won the cup”, while Sunderland’s retorted with: “we scored the goal”.

Nowadays, the Friendship Trophy is awarded to the team with the winning aggregate score in competitive matches over the season between the two sides, and as such, Sunderland are the current holders of the trophy, having won 4-2 over the two league games in the 2017/18 EFL Championship season.

The trophy was most recently contested in March 2023, when the teams played at Carrow Road, with Norwich carrying having a 1–0 advantage having beaten Sunderland at the Stadium of Light on 27 August 2022 in the EFL Championship, though ultimately following Sunderland's 1-0 victory at Carrow Road, the aggregate score stood at 1-1.

This trophy is only infrequently contested, as it requires both Norwich City and Sunderland to be in the same division, or to be drawn together in a cup competition, which last happened in 2009, when  Sunderland beat Norwich City 4–1 in the Football League Cup. The most significant cup meeting after the 1985 final was the semi-final of the 1991–92 FA Cup at Hillsborough, which Sunderland won 1–0.

In 2013, Talksport named The Friendship Trophy one of football's most pointless awards.

Head to head summary

Head-to-head fixtures

References

Norwich City F.C.
Sunderland A.F.C.
English football trophies and awards